The Ambassador of the United Kingdom to Greece is the United Kingdom's foremost diplomatic representative in Greece, and head of the UK's diplomatic mission in Greece.  The official title is His Britannic Majesty's Ambassador to the Hellenic Republic.

The modern Greek state (then the Kingdom of Greece) was established in 1832 at the London Conference of 1832 and internationally recognised in the same year by the Treaty of Constantinople, in which Greece secured full independence from the Ottoman Empire.

Besides the embassy in Athens, the UK government is represented by vice-consulates on the islands of Corfu, Crete and Rhodes, and by an honorary vice consulate on Zakynthos.

Heads of Mission

Minister Plenipotentiary to the King of Greece
1833–1835: Edward Dawkins
1835–1849: Sir Edmund Lyons, Bt
1849–1862: Sir Thomas Wyse

Envoy Extraordinary and Minister Plenipotentiary to the King of Greece
1862–1864: Peter Scarlett
1864–1872: Hon. Edward Erskine
1872–1877: Hon. William Stuart
1877–1881: Edwin Corbett
1881–1884: Clare Ford 
1884–1888: Sir Horace Rumbold, Bt
1888–1892: Hon. Edmund Monson
1892–1903: Edwin Egerton
1903–1917: Sir Francis Elliot
1917–1921: Granville Leveson-Gower, 3rd Earl Granville
1921–1922: Francis Lindley
Break in diplomatic relations – see 1922 in Greece

Envoy Extraordinary and Minister Plenipotentiary to the Hellenic Republic
1924–1926: Sir Milne Cheetham
1926–1929: Sir Percy Loraine, Bt
1929–1933: Hon. Patrick Ramsay
1933–1939: Sir Sydney Waterlow
1939–1943: Michael Palairet

Ambassador Extraordinary and Plenipotentiary 
1943–1946: Sir Reginald Leeper
1946–1951: Sir Clifford Norton
1951–1957: Sir Charles Peake
1957–1961: Sir Roger Allen
1962–1967: Sir Ralph Murray
1967–1971: Sir Michael Stewart
1971–1974: Sir Robin Hooper
1974–1978: Sir Brooks Richards
1978–1982: Sir Iain Sutherland
1982–1985: Sir Peregrine Rhodes
1985–1989: Sir Jeremy Thomas
1989–1993: Sir David Miers
1993–1996: Oliver Miles
1996–1999: Sir Michael Llewellyn-Smith
1999–2004: Sir David Madden
2004–2008: Sir Simon Gass
2008–2013: David Landsman
2013–2016: John Kittmer

2017–2021: Kate Smith
2021–: Matthew Lodge

References

External links
UK and Greece, gov.uk

Greece
 
United Kingdom